The String Quartet No. 13 in A minor (the Rosamunde Quartet), D 804, Op. 29, was written by Franz Schubert between February and March 1824. It dates roughly to the same time as his monumental Death and the Maiden Quartet, emerging around three years after his previous attempt to write for the string quartet genre, the Quartettsatz, D 703, that he never finished.

History
Starting in 1824, Schubert largely turned away from the composition of songs to concentrate on instrumental chamber music. In addition to the A-minor String Quartet, the Quartet in D minor, the Octet, the Grand Duo and Divertissement a la Hongroise (both for piano duet), and the Sonata for Arpeggione and Piano all date from that year. With the exception of the Grand Duo, all of these works display cyclic elements—that is, two or more movements in each work are deliberately related in some way to enhance the sense of unity. In the case of the A-minor Quartet, a motive from the third-movement Minuet becomes the most important melodic figure for the following finale.

Schubert dedicated the work to Schuppanzigh, who served as the first violinist of the string quartet appointed by Beethoven. Schuppanzigh himself played in the premiere performance which took place on 14 March 1824.

Structure

The quartet consists of four movements which last around 30 minutes in total.

References

Sources

Further reading

 Atanasovski, Srđan. 2011. "Schubert's 'Original Voice' in Quartets for Schuppanzigh: On Learned Style and New Sonic Qualities". Musicologica Austriaca: Jahresschrift der Österreichischen Gesellschaft für Musikwissenschaft 30:43–56.
 Bockholdt, Rudolf. 1998. "Die Kunst, heim zu finden: Über Schlüsse und Anschlüsse in Schuberts Instrumentalmusik". Musiktheorie 13, no. 2 (Franz Schubert: Jenseits des Jubiläums): 145–156.
 Brown, Maurice J. E. 1958. Schubert: A Critical Biography. London: Macmillan & Co. Ltd.; New York: St. Martin's Press.
 Cullen, Adam. 2008. "Schubert's Chamber Music as a Road Towards the Symphony". Maynooth Musicology 1:99–120.
 Cullen, Adam. 2009. "Dialectic Process and Sonata Form in Schubert's A Minor String Quartet, D 804". Maynooth Musicology 2:40–70.
 Gingerich, John Michael. 1996. "Schubert's Beethoven Project: The Chamber Music, 1824–1828". PhD diss. New Haven: Yale University.
 Hopkins, Robert G. 2013. "Multifunctional Codas in Sonata-Form Movements by Schubert". In Musical Implications: Essays in Honor of Eugene Narmour, edited and with an introduction by Lawrence F. Bernstein and Alexander Rozin, 191–223. Festschrift Series 25. Hillsdale, New York: Pendragon Press. .
 Rast, Nicholas. 2003. " 'Schöne Welt, wo bist du?' Motive and Form in Schubert's A-minor String Quartet". In Schubert the Progressive: History, Performance Practice, Analysis, edited and preface by Brian Newbould, 81–88. Aldershot, Hants; Burlington, Vermont: Ashgate. .
 Sobaskie, James William. 2003. "Tonal Implication and the Gestural Dialectic in Schubert's A-minor Quartet". In Schubert the Progressive: History, Performance Practice, Analysis, edited and preface by Brian Newbould, 53–79. Aldershot, Hants; Burlington, Vermont: Ashgate. .
 Waidelich, Till Gerrit. 1997. "Weitere Dokumente aus 1828 und 1833: Ein unkorrigierter früher Abzug der 'Einladung' zu Schuberts Privatkonzert und Berichte über die Berliner Ur- und Erstaufführungen der Streichquartette in a-Moll D 804 und d-Moll D 810". Schubert durch die Brille: Internationales Franz Schubert Institut—Mitteilungen, no. 19:57–64.

External links
 
 

String Quartet No. 13
1824 compositions
Compositions in A minor
Music dedicated to ensembles or performers